Orthosia revicta, known generally as the subdued Quaker or rusty whitesided caterpillar, is a species of cutworm or dart moth in the family Noctuidae. It is found in North America.

The MONA or Hodges number for Orthosia revicta is 10490.

References

Further reading

External links

 

Orthosia
Articles created by Qbugbot
Moths described in 1876